The Fourth Mainland Bridge is a 38 km long bridge project by the Lagos State Government, Nigeria, connecting Lagos Island by way of  Langbasa(Lekki) and Baiyeku(Ikorodu) across the Lagos Lagoon to Itamaga, in Ikorodu. The bridge is a 2 x 4 lane carriageway cross-sectional road with permission for BRT Lane and future road contraction. It is expected to become the second longest Bridge in Africa, featuring 3 toll plazas, 9 interchanges, 4.5 km Lagoon Bridge and an eco-friendly environment amongst other added features. The idea was conceptualized by the government of Senator Bola Ahmed Tinubu, former governor of Lagos State. Construction was planned to commence in 2017, 50 years after the state’s establishment and 26 years after the completion of the Third Mainland Bridge by the ex-military President Ibrahim Babangida and was expected to be completed by 2019, but construction has not been started as of January 2023. The project was to cost the state an estimated sum of ₦844 billion in the 2017 budget. In September 2020, the Lagos State Government proposed another sum of $2.2 billion for the construction. 800 houses are expected to be demolished as against the 4,000 earlier marked for demolition in the previous design that was realigned.

In April 2021 there were 6 bidders for the 2.5 billion USD project. By December the preferred bidder would be known.

In January 2022, the Lagos State Governor, Babajide Sanwo-Olu, notified the public that three companies have reached the final stage, and contract would be awarded in March 2022. He had earlier reiterated the plan by the state government to commence the construction on the Opebi-Mende link bridge and the 38-kilometre 4th mainland bridge: "Construction work on the 38km 4th Mainland Bridge — which will be the longest in Africa — and the Opebi-Mende link bridge will commence this year."

On December 29, 2022, The state government, through the Office of Public Private Partnerships had, announced Messrs CCECC-CRCCIG Consortium as the preferred bidder for the construction of the bridge. The Fourth Mainland Bridge project is expected to be finished in four years, according to the Lagos State Government. The bridge, when completed, would become the second longest in Africa with three toll plazas, nine interchanges, a 4.5 kilometre Lagoon Bridge and an eco-friendly environment. The Lagos state government had carried along the over 48 estates, traditional rulers and others that would be affected by the bridge.

It is also expected to span about 37 kilometres, starting from Abraham Adesanya in Ajah, on the Eti-Osa-Lekki-Epe corridor and traverse the North West towards the Lagoon shoreline of the Lagos-Ibadan Expressway via Owutu/Isawo in Ikorodu.

The new ("greenfield") tolled road will have an allowed maximum speed of 120 km/h.

References

Road bridges in Lagos
Lagos Island
Proposed transport infrastructure in Lagos